Something to Ponder is an album by guitarist Jimmy Ponder that was released by Muse in 1996.

Track listing 
All compositions by Jimmy Ponder except where noted
 "Johnny's Place" – 4:14
 "Since I Fell for You" (Buddy Johnson) – 12:11
 "Satin Doll" (Duke Ellington, Billy Strayhorn, Johnny Mercer) – 6:06
 "The Creator Has a Master Plan" (Pharoah Sanders) – 9:32
 "Moonlight in Vermont" (Karl Suessdorf, John Blackburn) – 7:32
 "Softly, as in a Morning Sunrise" (Sigmund Romberg, Oscar Hammerstein II) – 4:08
 "Sunshine" – 2:40

Personnel 
Jimmy Ponder – guitar
Mark Soskin – piano
Peter Washington – bass
Roger Humphries – drums

References 

Jimmy Ponder albums
1996 albums
Muse Records albums